Linda Halderman (June 30, 1968) is an American politician who served in the California State Assembly. She is a Republican.

Background
Linda Halderman is a board-certified General Surgeon who specializes in breast cancer diagnosis and treatment. Halderman graduated Phi Beta Kappa with a bachelor's degree in English from the University of Illinois. After earning a Medical Degree, she completed residency training at the UCSF-Fresno general surgery program.

Tenure in Assembly 
Halderman was elected to the California State Assembly in 2010.  While serving in the legislature, she charged that she was sexually harassed by Democratic state Senator Robert Hertzberg.  She claimed that over two months, he repeatedly hugged her closely and rubbed his groin against her.  When she complained to the Assembly's Chief Administrator, he dismissed her complaints and no action was taken against the Senator.

Discouraged, Halderman did not seek reelection in 2012.

References

American surgeons
Women surgeons
Living people
Republican Party members of the California State Assembly
People from Fresno, California
University of Illinois alumni
Women state legislators in California
21st-century American politicians
21st-century American women politicians
1968 births